Studio JMS is a studio started by J. Michael Straczynski in June 2012, announced at the 2012 San Diego Comic-Con International, to deal with the large volume of his written work. The studio was created to handle comic books, TV series, feature films, and games. The studio was run initially with Patricia Tallman.

Creation

Upcoming works

Films
The Flickering Light is a movie about how Nazi propagandist Leni Riefenstahl used Jewish prisoners from a concentration camp during the day who then returned to the camps at night. This filming became their reality and the camps became the nightmare. The adaptation was scheduled for production in the Fall of 2013 but has since languished in development (2017).

Web series
 The Adventures of Apocalypse Al is the result of a deal signed with MTV.com to produce a web series to follow on with a graphic novel. The novel is appeared in February 2014 in individual issues from MTV, and was collected into one volume in June 2014 
 Living Dead the Musical is a self-financed web series where the living dead after death would follow their passions, in this case, dance. To break this news at ComicCon 2012 he had a group of people dressed as zombies come in to his panel to dance.

TV Series
 Epidemic, working with Will Smith and James Lassiter Overbrook Entertainment for a new TV series.
 Vlad Dracula, working with Sam Raimi for Starz.
 Sense8, as one of six production companies working with the Wachowskis. The series ran for two seasons, from 2015 to 2017, then ended with a series finale in June 2018.

Comics
Studio JMS has partnered with Image Comics to breathe life into Joe's Comics. Launched in 2013 were:
 Protectors, Inc., a 21-issue maxiseries launched in November 2013.
 Ten Grand, drawn by Ben Templesmith, an ongoing series which debuted in May 2013.
 Sidekick, another ongoing title which was first published in August 2013.

In 2014 the newly announced titles included:

 Alone, a six-issue miniseries which was to be drawn by Bill Sienkiewicz. It was never published.
 Dream Police, an ongoing series drawn by Sid Kotian, originally published as part of Marvel's Icon Comics line
 Book of Lost Souls, a sequel to the 2005 mini series previously published by Marvel/Icon. The sequel was never published.

Due to Straczynski's diminishing eye sight, Studio JMS quit producing comic books in 2016.

References

External links
 

Works by J. Michael Straczynski